Rajashekara is a 1967 Indian Kannada-language film, directed by G. V. Iyer and produced by B. S. Ranga. The film stars Rajkumar, Bharathi Vishnuvardhan, Udaykumar, Balakrishna and Narasimharaju. The film has musical score by G. K. Venkatesh.

Cast

Rajkumar as Shekharavarma
Udaykumar as Jagamalla
Bharathi Vishnuvardhan
Balakrishna
Narasimharaju
B. M. Venkatesh
Vandana
Ramadevi
Rama
Papamma
Kupparaj
Raghavendra Rao
Dinesh
Shyam
Maccheri

References

External links
 
 

1960s Kannada-language films
Films scored by G. K. Venkatesh
Films directed by G. V. Iyer